is a subway station in Chiyoda, Tokyo, Japan, jointly operated by Tokyo Metro and Toei Subway. It is served by five lines, more than any other station on the Tokyo underground network, and is thus the biggest subway station in Tokyo. It is Tokyo Metro's second busiest station after Ikebukuro.

Otemachi is within walking distance (either at street level or via underground passages) of Tokyo Station.

Lines

Station layout

Tokyo Metro

Toei

History 
The station opened on July 20, 1956 as a station on the Marunouchi Line. The Tōzai Line platforms opened on October 1, 1966 as a terminus of the line from Nakano, becoming through platforms on September 14, 1967. The Chiyoda Line platforms opened on December 20, 1969 as the terminus of the line from Kita-Senju; they became through platforms on March 20, 1971. The Mita Line platforms opened on June 30, 1972, and the Hanzōmon Line platforms on January 26, 1989.

With the exception of the Mita Line, the station facilities of the remaining lines were inherited by Tokyo Metro after the privatization of the Teito Rapid Transit Authority (TRTA) in 2004.

Surrounding area 

 Tokyo Imperial Palace

References

External links

 Otemachi Station information (Tokyo Metro) 
 Otemachi Station information (Toei) 

Tokyo Metro Marunouchi Line
Tokyo Metro Tozai Line
Tokyo Metro Chiyoda Line
Tokyo Metro Hanzomon Line
Toei Mita Line
Marunouchi
Stations of Tokyo Metropolitan Bureau of Transportation
Railway stations in Tokyo
Railway stations in Japan opened in 1956
Buildings and structures in Chiyoda, Tokyo